Germán Gonzalo Real (born 17 April 1976) is a retired Argentine footballer whose last club was Central Norte of the Torneo Argentino A.

He also played for clubs in Chile, Bolivia, Ecuador, and Greece.

References

External links

1976 births
Living people
Argentine footballers
Argentine expatriate footballers
Argentina international footballers
Newell's Old Boys footballers
Unión de Santa Fe footballers
Talleres de Córdoba footballers
Colo-Colo footballers
Club Blooming players
S.D. Quito footballers
Argentine Primera División players
Chilean Primera División players
Expatriate footballers in Chile
Expatriate footballers in Bolivia
Expatriate footballers in Ecuador
Expatriate footballers in Greece
Association football forwards
Footballers from Rosario, Santa Fe